Kakou Ange Franck Williams "Angelo" Kouame (born December 15, 1997) is an Ivorian-Filipino basketball player. He played for the Ateneo Blue Eagles of the University Athletic Association of the Philippines (UAAP) were he won 3 championships and an MVP.

Early life and career
Kouame was born on December 15, 1997, in Abidjan, Ivory Coast. He was into football during his early childhood until developing interest in basketball when he and his younger brother requested their father for football kits but were instead given basketball jerseys. When his father died in 2012, he started committing on playing basketball as a means to cope for his loss. Koaume played 3-a-side street basketball with his friends and was part of his high school's basketball team, although he remarked that his stint with his school's team was "not that serious" and involved more "practicing".

Upon the recommendation of a friend, Kouame moved to the Philippines to study at the Ateneo de Manila University under a student-athlete scholarship. Kouame speaks fluent French (the national language of birth country, Ivory Coast) but did not speak English upon moving to the Philippines. He studied for one year at the Multiple Intelligence International School (MIIS) in Quezon City to develop his English speaking skills that would help him be acquainted with Filipino culture prior to attending Ateneo.

College career
Kouame was able to connect with the Ateneo Blue Eagles through his Cameroonian friend Aaron Njike who got recruited for a team in the United States. Njike linked Kouame to Ateneo varsity basketball team manager Epok Quimpo for an opportunity to try out for the college varsity team of Ateneo. He was assessed by coaches Yuri Escueta and Tab Baldwin, who was a team consultant for Ateneo at the time. Ateneo decided to have Kouame join the team despite lacking in fundamentals and training. Koaume only learned how to play traditional 5-a-side basketball in the Philippines and had to learn basketball terminologies in English.

Despite being a foreign player, Kouame did not have to fulfill a residency requirement, due to him graduating from MIIS in Quezon City and debuted for the Ateneo Blue Eagles in UAAP Season 81 in 2018. Prior to his UAAP debut, Kouame was part of Glory Be, Ateneo's B team for a year and also featured for the main collegiate team at the SMART City Hoops Basketball Championship, the SMART Breakdown Basketball Invitationals U25 Division, and the FilOil Preseason Cup in 2018.

He helped Ateneo clinch two consecutive titles; in UAAP Season 81 and 82. Following Kouame's granting of Filipino citizenship in May 2021 through a naturalization legislation passed by the Congress, the UAAP board made an agreement that Filipinos who received citizenship through an act of Congress shall still be considered as foreign student athletes (FSAs) in the collegiate league. By May 2021, Koaume has received offers to play for teams in other parts of Asia and in Europe.

Kouame stayed two more seasons with Ateneo. In that time he was the Season MVP for Season 84, and despite suffering multiple injuries, was the Finals MVP for Season 85.

National team career

Naturalization
Kouame has been considered for the Philippine national team as early as 2018, following his stint in the 2018 William Jones Cup in Taiwan with Ateneo. However, Kouame would have to obtain Filipino citizenship to be eligible. He successfully obtained consent from his mother to obtain Filipino citizenship, despite his mother hesitating initially over concerns that he might lose his Ivorian citizenship.

The Samahang Basketbol ng Pilipinas (SBP) in 2020 began to lobby in the Congress for Kouame to be given Filipino citizenship through naturalization following his performance in UAAP Season 82 which would make him eligible to play for the Philippine national team. Koaume was added to the national team's pool for the November 2020 window of the 2021 FIBA Asia Cup qualifiers despite a slim chance for his naturalization process to be completed in time for the Philippines' first match in that window. This was meant to help him get acquainted with the Philippine national team's system. The House of Representatives passed a bill granting Kouame citizenship on February 16, 2021, while the Senate passed its version on March 15. The SBP announced on May 18 that President Rodrigo Duterte had signed Kouame's naturalization bill into law.

Philippine national team
Kouame's eligibility to play for the Philippine national team was confirmed by FIBA in June 2021, a month after he was given Filipino citizenship. He was then included in the Philippines 12-man roster for the third and final round of the 2021 FIBA Asia Cup qualifiers. Kouame debuted for the Philippines in June 16 game against South Korea. The Philippines won 81–78 in that game with Kouame contributing 12 points and 6 rebounds. He also played in the 2020 FIBA Olympic Qualifying Tournament in Belgrade, Serbia.

In 2022, Kouame played against the Jordanian and Saudi Arabian national teams during the 2023 FIBA World Cup qualifiers.

References

1997 births
Living people
Ateneo Blue Eagles men's basketball players
Filipino men's basketball players
Filipino people of Ivorian descent
Centers (basketball)
Sportspeople from Abidjan
Ivorian men's basketball players
Ivorian emigrants to the Philippines
Naturalized citizens of the Philippines
Philippines men's national basketball team players